Lennart Larsson may refer to:
Lennart Larsson (cross-country skier) (1930–2021), Swedish cross-country skier
Lennart Larsson (footballer) (born 1953), former Swedish footballer
Lennart Larsson (Malmö FF footballer), former Swedish footballer